Inner Mongolia, an autonomous region of the People's Republic of China, is made up of prefecture-level divisions, which are divided into county-level divisions, which are then divided into township-level divisions.

Administrative divisions
This chart lists only the prefecture-level and county-level divisions of Inner Mongolia.

Recent changes in administrative divisions

Population composition and area

Prefectures

Counties

References

 
Inner Mongolia